Heinz Rehder (born 19 March 1916) was a German sports shooter. He competed in the trap event at the 1964 Summer Olympics.

References

External links
 
  

1916 births
Year of death missing
German male sport shooters
Olympic shooters of the United Team of Germany
Shooters at the 1964 Summer Olympics
Sportspeople from Magdeburg